The Clinton body count is a conspiracy theory that baselessly asserts former U.S. President Bill Clinton and wife, former U.S. Secretary of State Hillary Clinton, have secretly had their political opponents murdered, totaling as many as 50 or more. Such allegations have been circulated since at least 1994, when a film called The Clinton Chronicles, produced by Larry Nichols and promoted by Rev. Jerry Falwell, accused Bill Clinton of multiple crimes including murder.Additional promulgators of the conspircy include Newsmax publisher Christopher Ruddy, congresswoman Marjorie Taylor Greene, and others. 

Several sources have discredited the conspiracy theory, such as Congressional Record, the Lakeland Ledger, the Chicago Tribune, Snopes and others; pointing to detailed death records, the unusually large circle of associates that a president is likely to have, and the fact that many of the people listed had been misidentified or were still alive. Others had no known link to the Clintons.

History 

The Congressional Record (1994) condemns the list. While citing an article in U.S. News & World Report (August 8, 1994) by Greg Ferguson and David Bowermaster: "Whatever it is, Bill Clinton Likely Did It," it was determined that the original list, titled "Clinton Body Count: Coincidence or the Kiss of Death?,"  was compiled by lawyer and activist Linda Thompson. The report concluded "Thompson admits she has 'no direct evidence' of Clinton killing anyone. Indeed, she says the deaths were probably caused by 'people trying to control the president' but refuses to say who they were."

Alleged victims

C. Victor Raiser II 

C. Victor Raiser II was National Finance Co-chairman for Bill Clinton. He died in a plane crash along with his son and three others on July 30, 1992, during a fishing trip. Conspiracy theorists believe the crash to have been deliberately caused, however the National Transportation Safety Board ruled it as an accident, stating:[The probable cause of the accident was] the pilot's delayed decision in reversing course and his failure to maintain airspeed during the maneuver. Factors related to the accident were: mountainous terrain and a low ceiling.

Mary Mahoney 

Mary Mahoney was a former White House intern who, in the early summer of 1997, was gunned down during an attempted robbery inside the Starbucks in the Georgetown suburb of Washington, D.C. where Mahoney was working behind the counter. The robber entered the store and shot Mahoney after she attempted to take his gun. He then shot two Starbucks employees and fled. However, conspiracy theorists believe Mahoney was killed on the orders of the Clintons.

Vince Foster 

Deputy White House counsel Vince Foster was found dead in Fort Marcy Park in Virginia, outside Washington, D.C., on July 20, 1993. An autopsy determined that he was shot in the mouth, and no other wounds were found on his body. His death was ruled a suicide by five official investigations, but he remains a subject of conspiracy theories that he was actually murdered by the Clintons for knowing too much.

Seth Rich 

The unsolved 2016 murder of Democratic National Committee staff member Seth Rich prompted conspiracy theorists to speculate that Hillary Clinton arranged his death; the theory was based on a debunked Fox News report, later retracted, that Rich had been responsible for Wikileaks' release of DNC emails during the 2016 United States presidential campaign. Various elements of this theory have been promoted by Julian Assange and prominent right-wing figures like Alex Jones, Newt Gingrich, and Sean Hannity.

Jeffrey Epstein 

Convicted sex offender Jeffrey Epstein, being held on federal charges of child sex trafficking, was found dead in his cell at the high-security Metropolitan Correctional Center in Manhattan on August 10, 2019. An official autopsy later declared the cause of death as a suicide by hanging. His death led to conspiracy theories being relayed on social media, particularly relating to Bill Clinton and President Donald Trump. Hours after Epstein's death, Trump retweeted claims that Epstein's death was related to Clinton, including the hashtag #ClintonBodyCount. Lynne Patton, a Trump appointee at HUD, said "Hillary'd!!" and used the hashtag #VinceFosterPartTwo in an Instagram post about Epstein's death. Political commentator Dinesh D'Souza attempted to use the time he spent in a federal correctional center to lend authority to the conspiracy theory that the Clintons were responsible for Epstein's death.

Christopher Sign 

Reporter Christopher Sign broke the news of a meeting on June 27, 2016, on the Phoenix Sky Harbor tarmac between former President Bill Clinton and then-Attorney General Loretta Lynch. The timing of the meeting happened during the 2016 presidential election when then-candidate Hillary Clinton was under scrutiny for how she handled certain emails during her tenure as U.S. Secretary of State. Sign was found dead in his Alabama home on June 12, 2021. His death is being investigated as a suicide. Several right-wing figures, including Lauren Boebert, Dan Bongino and Charlie Kirk, as well as the pro-Trump cable news channel One America News Network, suggested that Sign had been murdered by the Clintons.

Jovenel Moïse 

Haitian president Jovenel Moïse was assassinated on July 7, 2021, when gunmen attacked his residence in Pèlerin 5, a district of Pétion-Ville. Martine Moïse, the first lady of Haiti, was hospitalized for wounds sustained during the attack. Some right-wing conspiracy theorists have claimed that the Clintons were involved in Moïse's death, pointing to political controversies regarding aid given to Haiti by the Clinton Foundation, such as "hurricane-proof" classroom trailers that were found to be structurally unsafe and laced with formaldehyde. Followers of the QAnon conspiracy theory, who claim that Donald Trump is secretly waging war against a cabal of child traffickers that includes the Clintons, heavily discussed the idea that they had a hand in the assassination. Discussion of the unfounded claim caused the term "Clintons" to become a top trend on Twitter.

Others 

Other persons linked to the Clinton Body Count include:
 Jim McDougal, a financial partner of the Clintons in the real estate venture that led to the Whitewater scandal. McDougal died of a heart attack at the Federal Correctional Facility in Fort Worth, Texas, on March 8, 1998.
 John F. Kennedy Jr., who was, according to polls, the most popular Democrat in New York. According to friends, Kennedy considered seeking the seat of retiring Sen. Daniel Moynihan in the 2000 United States Senate election in New York but died in a plane crash on July 16, 1999. Hillary Clinton was elected to Moynihan's vacated seat on November 7, 2000.
 Edward Eugene Willey, Jr., a Clinton fundraiser whose wife, Kathleen Willey, alleged on the CBS news magazine 60 Minutes that Bill Clinton had sexually assaulted her on November 29, 1993. Kathleen also testified on the Paula Jones sexual harassment suit against Clinton. Edward was found dead in the Virginia woods, and his death was ruled a suicide.
 Ron Brown, who served as the Secretary of Commerce during the first term of President Bill Clinton. Prior to this he was chairman of the Democratic National Committee. Brown had  been under investigation by an independent counsel for the Commerce Department trade mission controversy and was a material witness, who had been noticed to testify, in Judicial Watch's lawsuit against the Clinton Commerce Department. He and 34 others died in the 1996 Croatia USAF CT-43 crash.
 Jerry Parks, head of security for the Clinton headquarters during his presidential campaign in 1992, was killed on September 26, 1993, as he left a Mexican restaurant at the edge of Little Rock, Arkansas, by a man in another car that shot him ten times using a 9mm handgun. Parks’ son, Gary, asserted that his father collected a secret file of Clinton's "peccadilloes", and that his father was using the file to try to blackmail the Clinton campaign.
 Jean-Luc Brunel, suspected of being involved in a global pedophile ring organised by Epstein, died by suicide in prison before going on trial, on February 19, 2022. Senator Ted Cruz attempted to link Brunel's death to the Clintons by asking "Anyone know where Hillary was this weekend?".
 Don Henry and Kevin Ives, two Arkansas teenagers killed and their bodies were placed on railroad track on August 23, 1987.
 Mark Middleton, an Arkansas business leader, mutual friend of Bill Clinton and Jeffrey Epstein, and former finance director for Clinton's presidential campaign and later special assistant to Clinton, was found dead hanging from a tree thirty miles from his home with a shotgun wound in his chest with no weapon in site. On May 7, 2022. Middleton's family filed an injunction to prevent police photos of the scene from being released to the public, citing concerns that the images could encourage conspiracy theories. Judge Alice Gray will decide whether the photographs can be released. The coroner's report ruled the death a suicide even though he was tied to a tree and no weapon was found near the body.
 Fabricated tweets stating "I have information that will lead to the arrest of Hillary Clinton." were supposedly sent by figures such as celebrity chef Anthony Bourdain, basketball player Kobe Bryant, Supreme Court Justice Ruth Bader Ginsburg, former Japanese prime minister Shinzo Abe and Queen Elizabeth II prior to their deaths.

References 

Death conspiracy theories
Bill Clinton controversies
Hillary Clinton controversies
Conspiracy theories promoted by Donald Trump
Hashtags
United States presidents and death